Zoran Jovičič (born 4 November 1975 in Tuzla) is a Slovenian handball player who competed in the 2000 Summer Olympics and in the 2004 Summer Olympics.

References

1975 births
Living people
Slovenian male handball players
Olympic handball players of Slovenia
Handball players at the 2000 Summer Olympics
Handball players at the 2004 Summer Olympics
Sportspeople from Tuzla
21st-century Slovenian people